Harewood is a surname. Notable persons with that surname include:
 Adrian Harewood, Canadian broadcaster
 David Harewood (born 1965), British actor
 Dorian Harewood (born 1950), American actor
 Marlon Harewood (born 1979), English footballer

See also
 Earl of Harewood, a title in Peerage of the United Kingdom
 George Henry Hubert Lascelles, 7th Earl of Harewood, the previous holder of the Earldom
 Mary, Princess Royal and Countess of Harewood
 Haywood (surname)
 Heawood
 Harwood (name)

Surnames
English-language surnames
Surnames of English origin
Surnames of British Isles origin